Guanche is an extinct language that was spoken by the Guanches of the Canary Islands until the 16th or 17th century. It died out after the conquest of the Canary Islands as the Guanche ethnic group was assimilated into the dominant Spanish culture. The Guanche language is known today through sentences and individual words that were recorded by early geographers, as well as through several place-names and some Guanche words that were retained in the Canary Islanders' Spanish.

Classification
Guanche has not been classified with any certainty. Many linguists propose that Guanche was likely a Berber language, or at least related to the Berber languages. However, recognizable Berber words are primarily agricultural or livestock vocabulary, whereas no Berber grammatical inflections have been identified, and there is a large stock of vocabulary that does not bear any resemblance to Berber whatsoever. It may be that Guanche had a stratum of Berber vocabulary but was otherwise unrelated to Berber. Other strong similarities to the Berber languages are reflected in their counting system, while some authors suggest the Canarian branch would be a sister branch to the surviving continental Berber languages, splitting off during the early development of the language family and before the terminus post quem for the origin of Proto-Berber.

History
The name Guanche originally referred to a "man from Tenerife", and only later did it come to refer to all native inhabitants of the Canary Islands. Different dialects of the language were spoken across the archipelago. Archaeological finds on the Canaries include both Libyco-Berber and Punic inscriptions in rock carvings, although early accounts stated the Guanches themselves did not possess a system of writing.

The first reliable account of the Guanche language was provided by the Genovese explorer Nicoloso da Recco in 1341, with a list of the numbers 1–19, possibly from Fuerteventura. Recco's account reveals a base-10 counting system with strong similarities to Berber numbers.

Silbo, originally a whistled form of Guanche speech used for communicating over long distances, was used on La Gomera, El Hierro, Tenerife, and Gran Canaria. As the Guanche language became extinct, a Spanish version of Silbo was adopted by some inhabitants of the Canary Islands.

Numerals
Guanche numerals are attested from several sources, not always in good agreement (Barrios 1997). Some of the discrepancies may be due to copy errors, some to gender distinctions, and others to Arabic borrowings in later elicitations. Recco's early 1341 record notably uses Italian-influenced spelling.

* Also ,' an apparent copy error.

Recco only recorded 1–16; the combining forms for 11–16, which did not have this -ir-, are included as the hyphenated forms in the table above.

The Berber feminine ends in -t, as in Shilha 1: yan (m), yat (f); 2: sin (m), snat (f), and this may explain discrepancies such as been and vait for 'one'.

Cairasco is a misparsed counting song, .

Starting with Cedeño, new roots for '2' and '9' appear ('9' perhaps the old root for '4'), new roots for '4' and '5' (arba, kansa) appear to be Arabic borrowings, and old '5', '6', '7' offset to '6', '7', '8'.

Vocabulary
Below are selected Guanche vocabulary items from a 16th-century list by Alonso de Espinosa, as edited and translated by Clements Robert Markham (1907):

{| class="wikitable sortable"
! Guanche !! English gloss
|-
| adara || lake 
|-
| afaro || grain
|-
| aguere || lake
|-
| ahof, aho || milk
|-
| ahoren || barley meal roasted with butter
|-
| amen || sun
|-
| ana || sheep
|-
| ara || goat
|-
| aran || farm
|-
| xaxo || deceased; mummy
|-
| banot || spear
|-
| cancha || dog
|-
| cel || moon
|-
| chafa || lofty mountain ridge
|-
| chafaña || toasted grain
|-
| chamato || woman
|-
| coran || man
|-
| coraja || red owl
|-
| e-c, e-g || I (1st person)
|-
| era, iera || your
|-
| guan; ben || son (in reality "one of")
|-
| guañac || people; state
|-
| guaya || spirit, life
|-
| guijon, guyon || ships (-n ‘plural’)
|-
| guirre || vulture (Neophron percnopterus)
|-
| hacichei || beans, vetches
|-
| hari || multitude, people
|-
| jarco || mummy
|-
| manse || shore
|-
| mayec || mother
|-
| n-amet || bone
|-
| o-che || melted butter
|-
| petut || father?
|-
| t || thou, thy
|-
| th || they
|-
| tabayba || Euphorbia
|-
| tabona || obsidian knife
|-
| tagasaste || Cytisus proliferus (var.)
|-
| taginaste || Echium strictum
|-
| tamarco || coat of skins
|-
| tara || barley
|-
| taraire, tagaire || alternative name for Mt. Teid
|-
| xerco || shoe
|-
| xerax || sky
|-
| zonfa || navel
|}

Below are some additional basic vocabulary words in various Guanche dialects, from Wölfel (1965):

{| class="wikitable sortable"
! Guanche !! gloss !! dialect (island)
|-
| guan, cotan || man || 
|-
| chamato || woman || 
|-
| hari || people, multitude || Tenerife
|-
| doramas || nostrils || Gran Canaria
|-
| adargoma || shoulder || Gran Canaria
|-
| atacaicate || heart || Gran Canaria
|-
| garuaic || fist || 
|-
| zonfa || navel || Tenerife
|-
| agoñe || bone || Tenerife
|-
| taber || good || La Palma
|-
| tigotan || sky || La Palma
|-
| Achamán || sky, God || Tenerife
|-
| magec || sun || Tenerife, Gran Canaria?
|-
| ahemon || water || Hierro
|-
| aala(mon) || water || Gomera, Hierro
|-
| ade || water || La Palma
|-
| ide || fire || Tenerife
|-
| tacande || volcanic field || La Palma
|-
| cancha || dog || Gran Canaria, Tenerife
|-
| garehagua || dog || La Palma
|}

References

Further reading
Osorio Acevedo, Francisco. 2003. Gran diccionario guanche: el diccionario de la lengua de los aborígenes canarios. Tenerife: CajaCanarias. 
Villarroya, José Luis de Pando. 1996. Diccionario de voces guanches. Toledo: Pando Ediciones.
Villarroya, José Luis de Pando. 1987. Diccionario de la lengua Guanche. Madrid: Pando Ediciones.
Zyhlarz, Ernst. 1950. Das kanarische Berberisch in seinem sprachgeschichtlichen Milieu. Zeitschrift der deutschen morgenländischen Gesellschaft 100: 403-460.
Esteban, José M. 2003. Vocabulario canario guanche. Autores científico-técnicos y académicos 30:119-129.

External links

José Barrios: Sistemas de numeración y calendarios de las poblaciones bereberes de Gran Canaria y Tenerife en los siglos XIV-XV (PhD Dissertation, 1997)
Gerhard Böhm: Monumentos de la Lengua Canaria e Inscripciones Líbicas (Department of African Studies, University of Vienna - Occasional Paper No. 4 / February 2006)

Berber languages
Canarian culture
Extinct languages of Spain
Medieval languages
Guanche
Unclassified languages of Africa
Unclassified languages of Europe
Extinct languages of Africa
Languages extinct in the 17th century